David Sobolov (born October 23, 1964) is a Canadian voice actor and director, best known for his roles as Depth Charge in Beast Wars: Transformers,  Gorilla Grodd in various DC media, Drax the Destroyer in various Marvel media, Shockwave in Transformers: Prime and Blitzwing in Bumblebee.

Early life
Sobolov was born in Windsor, Ontario, Canada.

Filmography

Animation

Anime

Anime films

Film

Television

Video games

References

External links
 Official website
 
 
 David Sobolov featured on cnet's 404 show for iPhone App iMEvil
  Sobolov's personal website
 ROBOCOP Archive (Short Interview)
 Video Interview shot at Austin GDC 2007 by GameZombie.tv
 David Sobolov Inside the Games Interview
 David Sobolov interview with Super Hero Speak 2015

1964 births
Living people
Canadian male voice actors
Male actors from Windsor, Ontario